Kṣitigarbha (Wylie: sa yi snying po) is a bodhisattva primarily revered in East Asian Buddhism and usually depicted as a Buddhist monk. His name may be translated as "Earth Treasury", "Earth Store", "Earth Matrix", or "Earth Womb".  Kṣitigarbha is known for his vow to take responsibility for the instruction of all beings in the six worlds between the death of Gautama Buddha and the rise of Maitreya, as well as his vow not to achieve Buddhahood until all hells are emptied. He is therefore often regarded as the bodhisattva of hell-beings, as well as the guardian of children and patron deity of deceased children and aborted fetuses in Japanese culture.

Usually depicted as a monk with a halo around his shaved head, he carries a staff to force open the gates of hell and a wish-fulfilling jewel to light up the darkness.

Overview 
Kṣitigarbha is one of the four principal bodhisattvas in East Asian Mahayana Buddhism. The others are Samantabhadra, Manjusri, and Avalokiteśvara.

At the pre-Tang dynasty grottos in Dunhuang and Longmen, he is depicted in a classical bodhisattva form. After the Tang, he became increasingly depicted as a monk carrying Buddhist prayer beads and a staff.

His full name in Chinese is Dayuan Dizang Pusa, or "Kṣitigarbha Bodhisattva of the Great Vow," pronounced Daigan Jizō Bosatsu in Japanese, Jijang Bosal in Korean, Đại Nguyện Địa Tạng Vương Bồ Tát in Vietnamese. This name is a reference to his pledge, as recorded in the sutras, to take responsibility for the instruction of all beings in the six worlds in the era between the parinirvana of the Buddha and the rise of Maitreya. Because of this important role, shrines to Kṣitigarbha often occupy a central role in temples, especially within the memorial halls or mausoleums.

Sources

As a Brahmin maiden 
The story of Kṣitigarbha was first described in the Kṣitigarbha Bodhisattva Pūrvapraṇidhāna Sūtra, one of the most popular Mahayana sutras. This sutra is said to have been spoken by the Buddha towards the end of his life to the beings of the Trāyastriṃśa Heaven as a mark of gratitude and remembrance for his beloved mother, Maya. The Kṣitigarbha Bodhisattva Pūrvapraṇidhāna Sūtra begins, "Thus have I heard. Once the Buddha was abiding in Trayastrimsas Heaven in order to expound the Dharma to his mother."

The Kṣitigarbha Bodhisattva Pūrvapraṇidhāna Sūtra was first translated from Sanskrit into Chinese between 695 and 700 CE, during the Tang dynasty, by the Tripiṭaka master Śikṣānanda, a Buddhist monk from Khotan who also provided a new translation of the Avataṃsaka Sūtra and the Laṅkāvatāra Sūtra. However, some scholars have suspected that instead of being translated, this text may have originated in China, since no Sanskrit manuscripts of this text have been found. Part of the reason for suspicion is that the text advocates filial piety, which was stereotypically associated with Chinese culture. It stated that Kṣitigarbha practised filial piety as a mortal, which eventually led to making great vows to save all sentient beings. Since then, other scholars such as Gregory Schopen have pointed out that Indian Buddhism also had traditions of filial piety. Currently there is no definitive evidence indicating either an Indian or Chinese origin for the text.

In the Kṣitigarbha Sūtra, the Buddha states that in the distant past eons, Kṣitigarbha was a maiden of the Brahmin caste by the name of Sacred Girl. This maiden was deeply troubled upon the death of her mother - who had often been slanderous towards the Three Jewels. To save her mother from the great tortures of hell, the girl sold whatever she had and used the money to buy offerings that she offered daily to the Buddha of her time, known as the Buddha of the Flower of Meditation and Enlightenment. She prayed fervently that her mother be spared the pains of hell and appealed to the Buddha for help.

While she was pleading for help at the temple, she heard the Buddha telling her to go home, sit down, and recite his name if she wanted to know where her mother was. She did as she was told and her consciousness was transported to a Hell realm, where she met a guardian who informed her that through her fervent prayers and pious offerings, her mother had accumulated much merit and had already ascended to heaven. Sacred Girl was greatly relieved and would have been extremely happy, but the sight of the suffering she had seen in Hell touched her heart. She vowed to do her best to relieve beings of their suffering in her future lives for kalpas.

As a Buddhist monk 

There is a legend about how Kṣitigarbha manifested himself in China and chose his bodhimaṇḍa to be Mount Jiuhua, one of the Four Sacred Mountains of China.

During the reign of Emperor Ming of Han, Buddhism started to flourish, reaching its peak in the Tang and eventually spreading to Korea. At the time, monks and scholars arrived from those countries to seek the dharma in China. One of these pilgrims was a former prince from Silla named Kim Gyo-gak, who became a monk under the Chinese name Dizang "Kṣitigarbha," pronounced Jijang in Korean. He went to Mount Jiuhua in present-day Anhui. After ascending, he decided to build a hut in a deep mountain area so that he could cultivate the dharma.

According to records, Jijang was bitten by a poisonous snake but he did not move, thus letting the snake go. A woman happened to pass by and gave the monk medicines to cure him of the venom, as well as a spring on her son's behalf. For a few years, Jijang continued to meditate in his hut, until one day, a scholar named Chu-Ke led a group of friends and family to visit the mountain. Noticing the monk meditating in the hut, they went and took a look at his condition. They had noticed that his bowl did not contain any food, and that his hair had grown back.

Taking pity on the monk, Chu-Ke decided to build a temple as an offering to him. The whole group descended the mountain immediately to discuss plans to build the temple. Mount Jiuhua was also property of a wealthy person called Elder Wen-Ke, who obliged to build a temple on his mountain. Therefore, Wen-Ke and the group ascended the mountain once more and asked Jijang how much land he needed.

Jijang replied that he needed a piece of land that could be covered fully by his kasaya. Initially believing that a piece of sash could not provide enough land to build a temple, they were surprised when Jijang threw the kasaya in the air, and the robe expanded in size, covering the entire mountain. Elder Wen-Ke had then decided to renounce the entire mountain to Jijang, and became his protector. Sometime later, Wen-Ke's son also left secular life to become a monk.

Jijang lived in Mount Jiuhua for 75 years before passing away at the age of 99. Three years after his nirvana, his tomb was opened, only to reveal that the body had not decayed. Because Jijang led his wayplace with much difficulty, most people had the intuition to believe that he was indeed an incarnation of Kṣitigarbha.

Jijang's well-preserved, dehydrated body may still be viewed today at the monastery he built on Mount Jiuhua.

Iconography

Traditional iconography 
In Buddhist iconography, Kṣitigarbha is typically depicted with a shaven head, dressed in a monk's simple robes (unlike most other bodhisattvas, who are dressed like Indian royalty).

In his left hand, Kṣitigarbha holds a tear-shaped jewel or cintamani (Chinese: 如意寶珠; Pinyin: Rúyì bǎozhū; Romaji: Nyoihōju) in his right hand, he holds a Khakkhara (Chinese: 錫杖; Pinyin: Xīzhàng; Rōmaji: Shakujō), which is used to alert insects and small animals of his approach, so that he will not accidentally harm them. This staff is traditionally carried by Buddhist monks. Like other bodhisattvas, Kṣitigarbha usually is seen standing on a lotus base, symbolizing his release from rebirth. Kṣitigarbha's face and head are also idealised, featuring the third eye, elongated ears and the other standard attributes of a buddha.

In the Chinese tradition, Kṣitigarbha is sometimes depicted wearing a crown like the one worn by Vairocana. His image is similar to that of the fictional character Tang Sanzang from the classical novel Journey to the West, so observers sometimes mistake Kṣitigarbha for the latter. In China, Kṣitigarbha is also sometimes accompanied by a dog. This is in reference to a legend that he found his mother reborn in the animal realm as a dog named Diting, which the Bodhisattva adopted to serve as his steed and guard.

In Japan, Kṣitigarbha's statues are often adorned with bibs, kerchiefs or kasa hat on his head, and sometimes dressed with a haori. Tōsen-ji in Katsushika, Tokyo, contains the "Bound Kṣitigarbha" of Ōoka Tadasuke fame, dating from the Edo period. When petitions are requested before Kṣitigarbha, the petitioner ties a rope about the statue. When the wish is granted, the petitioner unties the rope. At the new year, the ropes of the ungranted wishes are cut by the temple priest.

Kṣitigarbha as Lord of the Six Ways 

Another category of iconographic depiction is Kṣitigarbha as the Lord of the Six Ways, an allegorical representation of the Six Paths of Rebirth of the Desire realm (rebirth into hell, or as pretas, animals, asuras, men, and devas). The Six Paths are often depicted as six rays or beams radiating from the bodhisattva and accompanied by figurative representations of the Six Paths. Many of these depictions in China can be found in Shaanxi province, perhaps a result of Sanjiejiao teachings in the area.

A Japanese variation of this depiction is the Six Kṣitigarbhas, six full sculptural manifestations of the bodhisattva. An example of this can be found in Konjikidō, the ‘Hall of Gold,’ in the Chūson-ji temple.

In Buddhist traditions

Chinese traditions 

Mount Jiuhua in Anhui is regarded as Kṣitigarbha's bodhimaṇḍa. It is one of the Four Sacred Buddhism Mountains in China, and at one time housed more than 300 temples. Today, 95 of these are open to the public. The mountain is a popular destination for pilgrims offering dedications to Kṣitigarbha. In certain Chinese Buddhist legends, the arhat Maudgalyayana, known in Chinese as Mùlián (目連), acts as an assistant to Ksitigarbha in his vow to save the denizens of hell. As a result, Mùlián is usually also venerated in temples that enshrine Ksitigarbha. In folk beliefs, the mount of Ksitigarbha, Diting, is a divine beast that can distinguish good from evil, virtuous and foolish. In iconographic form, it is often enshrined at the side of Ksitigarbha, or portrayed with Ksitigarbha riding on its back as a mount.

In some areas, the admixture of traditional religions has led to Kṣitigarbha being also regarded as a deity in Taoism and Chinese folk religion. Kṣitigarbha Temples (Chinese: 地藏庵; Pinyin: Dìzàng'ān) are Taoist temples that usually enshrine Kṣitigarbha as the main deity, along with other gods typically related to the Chinese netherworld Diyu, such as Yanluo Wang and Heibai Wuchang. Believers usually visit these temples to pray for the blessings of the ancestors and the souls of the dead.

Japanese traditions 

In Japan, Kṣitigarbha, known as Jizō, or respectfully as Ojizō-sama, is one of the most loved of all Japanese divinities. His statues are a common sight, especially by roadsides and in graveyards.

Children's limbo legend 
In a later version such as the one recorded by Lafcadio Hearn, the oni demons wreck the stone piles, and torment the children, and the children seek haven with Kṣitigarbha who hides them inside his garment and comforts them.

This concept of Sai no Kawara, or children's limbo first appeared in the Otogizōshi of the Muromachi Period, and in fact, the "Tale of the Fuji Cave" related above is one such work from the Otogizōshi. So the notion was developed quite late, in the post-medieval era, although it has been associated with the priest Kūya (10th century). The Kṣitigarbha and the Sai no Kawara legend was connected with the Kūya and his wasan, or chantings probably some time in the 17th century, creating the Jizō wasan. Also, as to the identification of certain geographic features as Sai no Kawara on Osorezan mountain in northern Japan, the establishment of the Kṣitigarbha cult there is of late-Tokugawa Period vintage, early to mid 18th century, despite temple pamphlets (engi, or account of the founding of temples) purporting origins dating back to the 9th century, with the priest Ennin alleged to have established the place of worship for the Kṣitigarbha at Mt. Osore (in olden times styled "Mount Usori").

Lost pregnancies 

Offerings 

Kṣitigarbha statues are sometimes accompanied by a little pile of stones and pebbles, put there by people in the hope that it would shorten the time children have to suffer in the underworld. (The act is derived from the tradition of building stupas as an act of merit-making.)
Traditionally, he is seen as the guardian of children, and in particular, children who died before their parents. The statues can sometimes be seen wearing tiny children's clothing or bibs, or with toys, put there by grieving parents to help their lost ones and hoping that Kṣitigarbha would specially protect them. Sometimes the offerings are put there by parents to thank Kṣitigarbha for saving their children from a serious illness. His features are commonly made more baby-like to resemble the children he protects.

Roadside god 
As Kṣitigarbha is seen as the saviour of souls who have to suffer in the underworld, his statues are common in cemeteries. He is also believed to be one of the protective deities of travellers, the dōsojin, and roadside statues of Kṣitigarbha are a common sight in Japan. Firefighters are also believed to be under his protection.

Southeast Asian traditions 

In Theravada Buddhism, the story of a bhikkhu named Phra Malai with similar qualities to Kṣitigarbha is well known throughout Southeast Asia, especially in Thailand and Laos. Legend has it that he was an arhat from Sri Lanka who achieved great supernatural powers through his own merit and meditation. He is also honoured as a successor to Mahāmoggallāna, the Buddha's disciple foremost for his supernatural attainments. In the story, this pious and compassionate monk descends to Hell to give teachings and comfort the suffering hell-beings there. He also learns how the hell-beings are punished according to their sins in the different hells.

Mantra 
In mainstream Chinese Buddhism and Japanese Shingon Buddhism, the mantra of Kṣitigarbha comes from the "Treasury of Mantras" section of the Mahavairocana Tantra. The effect of this mantra is producing the "Samadhi Realm of Adamantine Indestructible Conduct." This mantra is the following:

Other mantras 
 Mantra of Eliminating Fixed Karma:

 In Chinese, this mantra is called  in pinyin. It reads: 
 In Chinese Buddhism, the following mantra is associated with Kṣitigarbha:

 In Korean Buddhism, the following mantra is associated with Kṣitigarbha:

 In Tibetan Buddhism, the following mantra is associated with Kṣitigarbha:
 
 In Shingon Buddhism, a mantra used in public religious services is:

 In Sanskrit:
 
Om! Ha ha ha! O wondrous one! svāhā!

Haiku & Senryū

In popular culture 
 The Saviour Monk is a 1975 Hong Kong film starring David Tang wei as Dizang-wang (Ksitigarbha king), and Doris lung Chun-Erh. The film was directed by Liang Che-Fu. By 2020, the movie has been digitally restored by the Hong Kong Embassy In The Philippines and the University of the Philippines Film Institute.
 The vandalism of a Kṣitigarbha statue is the central theme of The Locker, a 2004 Japanese horror and thriller film directed by Kei Horie.
 In the 1988 video game Super Mario Bros. 3, Mario and Luigi gain the ability to turn into Kṣitigarbha statues upon donning a Tanooki Suit. In this form, they are impervious to damage, but cannot move. This ability returns in the 2011 video game Super Mario 3D Land, where it can only be used after collecting a Statue Leaf. Additionally, multiple Kṣitigarbha statues appear in the Bowser's Kingdom area in Super Mario Odyssey. Mario can capture certain Kṣitigarbha statues in order to solve a handful of puzzles.
 In the 2004 video game Ninja Gaiden, a defaced Kṣitigarbha statue can be found in the hero's village, with its head knocked off. If you replace the head, the statue's cintamani becomes a "Life of the Gods" item that can extend your maximum health.
 In 2004 Hong Kong drama, My Date with a Vampire III Ksitigarbha was portrayed by Ricky Chan, also known as Ma Siu-Fu, Ma Siu-Ling's twin brother. He starts a romance with Chang'e and is unaware that she has actually been going around killing people when she cannot control her vampire bloodlust. Later in the series, he is revealed to be the reincarnation of the bodhisattva Ksitigarbha (地藏王; Dìzàng Wáng), who presides over the Underworld and relentlessly tries to help the souls of the damned get out of Hell. He helps the protagonists in their quest to stop Yaochi Shengmu and Fuxi from fighting and ending the world.
 In the 2022 video game Ghostwire: Tokyo, praying to Kṣitigarbha statues (referenced as Jizo statues in-game) allows the player to carry more ether, which is used to attack enemies.

See also 
 Karuṇā (Brahmavihara)
 Kṣitigarbha Bodhisattva Pūrvapraṇidhāna Sūtra
 Maliyadeva
 Phra Malai Kham Luang
 Avalokitesvara, Samantabhadra & Manjusri
 King Yama & Yanluo Wang
 Mount Jiuhua & Kim Gyo-gak
 Diting
 Mizuko kuyō
 Butsu Zone, a manga in which Kṣitigarbha is a main character

Explanatory notes

References

Bibliography 

 
 
 
 
 French, Frank G. (ed); Shi, Daoji (trans.)(2003). The Sutra of Bodhisattva Ksitigarbha's Fundamental Vows (地藏經), Sutra Translation Committee of the U.S. and Canada/The Corporate Body of the Buddha Educational Foundation Taipei, Taiwan, 2nd ed.
 
 
 Moto-Sanchez, Milla Micka (2016). Jizō, Healing Rituals, and Women in Japan, Japanese Journal of Religious Studies 43 (2), 307-331
 
 Visser, Marinus Willem de (1914). The Bodhisattva Ti-Tsang (Jizo) in China and Japan,  Berlin: Oesterheld

External links 

 Jizo Bodhisattva - Photo Dictionary of Japanese Buddhism
 Dizang text from Dunhuang
 The Sutra of the Past Vows of Earth Store Bodhisattva

 
Bodhisattvas
Buddhism and abortion
Buddhism and children
Buddhism in China
Buddhism in Japan
Childhood gods
Chinese gods
Psychopomps
Stillbirth